The Inside Soap Awards is a yearly British award ceremony run by Inside Soap magazine since 1996. The awards celebrate both British and Australian soap operas and their actors. The current soap operas nominated for awards are Casualty, Coronation Street, Doctors, EastEnders, Emmerdale, Hollyoaks and Home and Away. Now defunct soaps that were formerly nominated for awards are Take the High Road, Springhill, Sunset Beach The Bill, Bad Girls, Brookside, Crossroads, Family Affairs, Night and Day, Where the Heart Is, Waterloo Road, Holby City and Neighbours.

2001 winners

2002 winners

2003 winners

2004 winners

2005 winners

2006 winners

2007 winners

2008 winners

2009 winners

2010 winners

2011 winners

2012 winners

2013 winners

2014 winners

2015 winners

2016 winners

2017 winners

2018 winners
The winners were announced on 22 October 2018.

2019 winners
The longlist was announced on 1 July 2019. The winners were announced on 7 October 2019.

2020 winners
The longlist was announced on 14 September 2020. The winners were announced on 23 November 2020.

2021 winners
The longlist was announced on 28 September 2021. The winners were announced on 23 November 2021.

2022 winners
The longlist was announced on 19 July 2022. The shortlist was revealed on 11 October 2022. The winners were announced on 17 October 2022.

Awards totals
Key:
 – Best Soap award winner

References

British television awards
Soap opera awards